Edwin Tobias Earl (May 30, 1858 – January 2, 1919) was an American businessman, newspaper publisher and philanthropist.

Biography

Early life
Edwin T. Earl was born on a fruit ranch near Red Bluff, California on May 30, 1858. His father was Joseph Earl and his mother, Adelia Chaffee. His brother was Guy Chaffee Earl.

Career
He started his career in the shipping of fruits. By 1886, he was President of the Earl Fruit Company. In 1890, he invented the refrigerator car to transport fruits to the East Coast of the United States. He established the Continental Fruit Express and invested US$2,000,000 in refrigerator cars. In 1901, he sold his refrigerator cars to Armour and Company of Chicago and became a millionaire.

In 1901, he purchased the Los Angeles Express and became its editor. Ten years later, in 1911, he also purchased the Los Angeles Tribune.

He also invested in real estate in Los Angeles.

He was a Freemason, a member of the California Club and the Jonathan Club, two private member's clubs in Los Angeles, and the Bolsa Chica Gun Club. He was a member of the California Republican Party.

Philanthropy
In 1901, he made a donation to the Pacific School of Religion  in Berkeley, California to start the Earl Lectures. For more than a hundred years, it has featured distinguished guest speakers like Theodore Roosevelt, Maya Angelou, Harry Emerson Fosdick and Cecil Williams.

Personal life
He married Emily Jarvis Earl of Louisville, Kentucky on April 30, 1902. They had three sons, Jarvis, Edwin (1905–1981) and Chaffee, and one daughter, Emily. They resided in Los Angeles, California. He died on January 2, 1919, in Los Angeles.

References
 US Patent and Trademark Office, Patent #: US0RE011324

External links
Huntington Digital Library: Photograph

1858 births
1919 deaths
People from Red Bluff, California
People from Los Angeles
American Freemasons
American newspaper publishers (people)
California Republicans
Journalists from California
19th-century American philanthropists
19th-century American businesspeople